Pleasantdale is a village in the Canadian province of Saskatchewan within the Rural Municipality of Pleasantdale No. 398 and Census Division No. 14.

History 
Pleasantdale incorporated as a village on January 1, 1987.

Demographics 

See also 

 List of communities in Saskatchewan
 Villages of Saskatchewan

References

Villages in Saskatchewan
Pleasantdale No. 398, Saskatchewan
Division No. 14, Saskatchewan